is a Japanese actor. Takahashi was affiliated with the acting unit D-BOYS, produced by Watanabe Entertainment. He is well known for his role as Ryoma Echizen in 5th cast of "Tennis no Oujisama ~ Musicals". He retired from the entertainment business due to health reasons on June 30, 2016. In 2019, he returned to the entertainment industry by joining the band WIN=W1N.

Filmography

TV series

Films

Theatre

TENIMYU: THE PRINCE OF TENNIS MUSICAL SERIES (as Ryoma Echizen)

The Prince of Tennis Musical: The Imperial Presence Hyotei Gakuen feat. Higa (2008) (he and the 5th Seigaku cast took turns performing with the 4th Seigaku cast during its overseas performances)
The Prince of Tennis Musical: The Treasure Match Shitenhoji feat. Hyotei (2008-2009) (again, he and the 5th cast took turns performing the Seigaku roles)
The Prince of Tennis Musical: Dream Live 6th (2009) (as this was the graduation show for the 4th cast, Ryuki and the 5th Seigaku cast now took over their roles as the next cast until Dream Live 7th)
The Prince of Tennis Musical: The Final Match Rikkai feat. Shitenhoji (2009)
The Prince of Tennis Musical: The Final Match Rikkai Second feat. Rivals (2009-2010)
The Prince of Tennis Musical: Dream Live 7th (2010)

D-BOYS
D-BOYS STAGE vol 3: Karasu 04
D-BOYS: Natsudoko 2009
D-BOYS STAGE vol 4: The Last Game
D-BOYS STAGE 2011: The Merchant of Venice

References

1993 births
Living people
21st-century Japanese male actors